Sir James Cockburn, 9th Baronet, of Langton, Berwickshire (21 March 1771 – 26 February 1852) was British Governor of Bermuda from 1811 to 1812, from 1814 to 1816 and from 1817 to 1819.

He was the eldest son of Sir James Cockburn, 8th Baronet (1729–1804) and his second wife Augusta Anne Ayscough. His maternal grandfather was Francis Ayscough, Dean of Bristol.

His younger brothers were:
Sir George Cockburn, 10th Baronet (1772–1853), MP and Admiral of the Fleet of the United Kingdom;
Sir William Cockburn, 11th Baronet (1773–1858), Dean of York; and
Alexander Cockburn (1776–1852) served as British consul to Hamburg and envoy extraordinary and minister plenipotentiary to Württemberg and the Columbia District. He married Yolande de Vignier, daughter of the vicomte de Vignier, of Santo Domingo, and parented:
Sir Alexander Cockburn, 12th Baronet, Lord Chief Justice of England.

On 14 October 1801, Cockburn married Marianna Devereux. She was a daughter of George Devereux, 13th Viscount Hereford by his wife and possible distant relative Marianna Devereux. They had a daughter:
Marianna Augusta Cockburn. Married Sir James John Hamilton, 2nd Baronet.

He also served as Paymaster and Inspector General of the Royal Marines from 1819 to 1831 and was granted the rank of major-general in 1831. He was appointed the High Sheriff of Carmarthenshire for 1847.

Bibliography

A listing of the Cockburn family.

1771 births
1852 deaths
Governors of Bermuda
High Sheriffs of Carmarthenshire
Baronets in the Baronetage of Nova Scotia
James 9